Hibiscus lasiocarpos (also, H. lasiocarpus orth. var.) is a species of hibiscus known by the common name hairy-fruited hibiscus. It is also one of several hibiscus called rosemallow. It is native to much of the southeastern United States, as well as parts of California and northern Mexico. It is a large, bushy perennial herb with sprawling stems reaching one to two meters long. The leaves are heart-shaped, toothed, and pointed, and generally between 6 and 10 centimeters long. The inflorescence holds large showy, solitary flowers. Each flower has a cup of partly fused sepals beneath a layer of slender bracts. These may be covered in hairs or woolly fibers. The flower's large petals may be up to 10 centimeters long and are generally bright white with red bases. The stamen tube and anthers are white or cream. The fruit is a capsule 2.5–3 centimeters long containing spherical seeds.

References

External links
USDA Plants Profile
Photo gallery

 pp. 159–160 and plate LXX

lasiocarpos